Watchman Nee, Ni Tuosheng, or  Nee T'o-sheng (November 4, 1903 – May 30, 1972), was a Chinese church leader and Christian teacher who worked in China during the 20th century. His evangelism was influenced by the Plymouth Brethren.

In 1922, he initiated church meetings in Fuzhou, Fujian province, that may be considered the beginning of the local churches. During his thirty years of ministry, Nee published many books expounding the Bible. He established churches throughout China and held many conferences to train Bible students and church workers. Following the Communist Revolution, Nee was persecuted and imprisoned for his faith and spent the last twenty years of his life in prison. He was honoured by Christopher H. Smith (R–NJ) in the US Congress on July 30, 2009.

Family and childhood
Watchman Nee was born on November 4, 1903, the third of nine children of Ni Weng-hsiu, a well-respected officer in the Imperial Customs Service, and Lin He-Ping (Peace Lin), who excelled as a child at an American-staffed Methodist mission school. His grandfather was a gifted Anglican preacher. During a stint at the Chinese Western Girls' School in Shanghai to improve her English, Lin He-Ping met Dora Yu, a young woman who gave up a potential career in medicine to serve as an evangelist and preacher.

Since Nee's parents were both Methodists, he was baptized by a bishop of the Methodist Church as an infant.

Early schooling
In 1916, at age 13, Nee entered the Church Missionary Society Vernacular Middle School in Fuzhou, Fujian province to begin his Western-style education. He then went on to the middle school at Trinity College in Fuzhou, where he demonstrated great intelligence and ambition. Among his classmates was Wilson Wang, brother of one of Watchman Nee's good friends, Leland Wang. The two boys completed college despite severe flooding which brought cholera and plague and hardship to their region. In the final examinations, the 2 boys scored almost the same marks with Wilson Wang topping the class, followed closely by Watchman Nee in second place.<ref name="Lee, Joseph Tse-Hei 2005">Lee, Joseph Tse-Hei. Watchman Nee and the Little Flock Movement in Maoist China.'Church History 74:1 (2005)</ref>

Conversion and training
In the spring of 1920, when Nee was 17, Dora Yu was invited to hold ten days of revival meetings in the Church of Heavenly Peace in Fuzhou.  After Nee's mother attended these meetings, she was moved to apologize to her son for a previous incident of unjust punishment. Her action impressed Nee so much that he determined to attend the next day's evangelistic meetings to see what was taking place there.  After returning from the meeting, according to Nee's own account:

As a student at Trinity College, Nee began to speak to his classmates concerning his salvation experience. Later, he recounted:

After his conversion, Nee desired to be trained as a Christian worker. He first attended Dora Yu's Bible Institute in Shanghai, though he was still a high school student. However, he was dismissed due to his bad and lazy habits, such as sleeping in late. Eventually, Nee's seeking to improve his character brought him into close contact with a British missionary Margaret E. Barber who became his teacher and mentor.Lee, Joseph Tse-Hei. Watchman Nee and the Little Flock Movement in Maoist China. Church History 74:1 (2005), 73. Nee would visit Barber on a weekly basis in order to receive spiritual help. Barber treated Nee as a young learner and frequently administered strict discipline.  When she died in 1930, Barber left all of her belongings to Nee, who wrote:

The Plymouth Brethren connection
Through Barber, Watchman Nee was introduced to the writings of D.M. Panton, Robert Govett, G.H. Pember, Jessie Penn-Lewis, T. Austin-Sparks, and others. In addition, he acquired books from Plymouth Brethren teachers like John Nelson Darby, William Kelly, and C.H. Mackintosh. Eventually, his personal library encompassed over three thousand titles on church history, spiritual growth, and Bible commentary, and he became intimately familiar with the Bible through diligent study using many different methods. In the early days of his ministry, he is said to have spent one-third of his income on personal needs, one-third to assist others, and the remaining third on spiritual books. He was known for his ability to select, comprehend, discern, and memorize relevant material, and grasp and retain the main points of a book while reading.

Nee derived many of his ideas, including plural eldership, disavowal of a clergy-laity distinction, and worship centered around the Lord's Supper, from the Plymouth Brethren. From 1930 to 1935, his movement interacted internationally with the Raven-Taylor group of Exclusive Brethren led by James Taylor, Sr. This group "recognized" the Local Church movement as a parallel work of God, albeit one that had developed independently. Nee refused, however, to follow their practice of isolating themselves from other Christians and rejected their ban on celebrating The Lord's Supper with other Christians. Matters came to a head when Exclusive Brethren leaders learned that during his 1933 visits to the United Kingdom and the United States Nee had broken bread with Honor Oak Christian Fellowship associated with the independent ministry of T. Austin-Sparks and with non-Brethren missionaries whom Nee had known in China. After a series of communications Nee received a letter dated 31 August 1935, signed by leading Brethren, severing fellowship with him and his movement.

Marriage
As a teenager, Nee fell in love with Charity Chang. Their two families had been friends for three generations. When Nee became a Christian, Charity ridiculed Jesus in Nee's presence. This bothered him. Eventually, after much struggling, Nee felt he needed to give up on their relationship. Ten years later, after finishing her university education, Charity became a Christian. She began attending church meetings in Shanghai in 1934. In the same year, during Nee's fourth "Overcomer Conference" in Hangzhou, the two were married. Charity cared for Nee in his frequent illness and was the only visitor Nee was permitted during his imprisonment. They had no children.

Ministry
In 1936, before a group of fellow workers, Watchman Nee outlined the commission of his ministry:

Nee began to write and publish at a very early age. In 1923, he began to publish the magazine The Present Testimony, and in 1925, he started another magazine entitled The Christian. It was also in 1925 when Nee changed his name from Ni Shu-tsu to Ni To-sheng (English translation: Watchman Nee). At age 21, Nee established the first "local church" in Sitiawan, Malaysia while visiting his mother, who had moved there from China. In 1926, Nee established up another local church in Shanghai, which became the center of his work in China. By 1932, Nee's practice of meeting as local churches spread throughout China, Indonesia, Malaysia, and Singapore. He maintained this pattern until his imprisonment.

In 1928, Nee published a three-volume book entitled The Spiritual Man. In February of the same year, Nee held his first "Overcomer Conference" in Shanghai. In January 1934, Nee called a special conference on the subjects of "Christ as the Centrality and Universality of God" and "The Overcomers". According to Nee, this was a turning point for him in his ministry. He said, "My Christian life took a big turn from doctrines and knowledge to a living person, Christ, who is God's centrality and universality."

In February 1934, Nee gave a series of talks in which he defined and expounded the practice of the local churches, stating that in the Bible, the church is never divided into regions and never denominated based on a teaching or doctrine. These talks were eventually published in the book The Assembly Life. In May of the same year, Nee encouraged Witness Lee to move to Shanghai from Yantai in order to join him and Ruth Lee in their work editing Nee's publications.

In 1938, Nee traveled to Europe and gave messages that were later published as The Normal Christian Life. Upon his return, Nee gave a conference on the Body of Christ. According to Nee, this was the second turn in his ministry. Nee recounted, "My first turn was to know Christ, and my second turn was to know His Body. To know Christ is only half of what the believers need. The believers also must know the Body of Christ. Christ is the head, and He is also the Body."

In 1939, Nee became involved with his second brother's failing pharmaceutical company. Although acquiescing to family pressure, Nee also saw this as an opportunity to support his many co-workers who were suffering great poverty and hardship during the Second World War. Nee took over full management of the factory, reorganized it, and began to employ many local church members from Shanghai. At this time, some of the elders from the church in Shanghai questioned Nee's involvement in business, causing Nee to suspend his ministry in 1942. Shortly afterward, the church in Shanghai stopped meeting altogether.

On March 6, 1945, Nee moved to Chongqing to oversee the factory there. There, he delivered a series of messages on Revelation 2 and 3 published as The Orthodoxy of the Church as well as messages on the Song of Songs. On September 9, 1945, the Japanese army surrendered in China, ending the Second Sino-Japanese War. In 1946, Peace Wang and Witness Lee began to work to restore the church in Shanghai as well as Nee's public ministry there. Nee purchased twelve bungalows at Kuliang to hold trainings for his co-workers in the Christian work. By April 1948, a revival was brought to the church in Shanghai, and Nee resumed his ministry there. When he returned, Nee handed his pharmaceutical factory over to the Christian work as an offering to God, influencing many others to hand over their possessions to the work. Within a short time, the church in Shanghai grew to over 1000 members.

Persecution and imprisonment
The rise of the Chinese Communist Party in 1949, with its doctrine of state atheism, caused Christians to come under great persecution.Adeney, David. China: Christian Students Face the Revolution. Downers Grove: Intervarsity Press (1973). False charges and arrests were also brought against many foreign missionaries. Through intensive propaganda campaigns and threats of imprisonment, believers were influenced to accuse one another.Kuhn, Isobel. Green Leaf in Drought. Kent: OMF Books (1958).

On April 10, 1952, Watchman Nee was arrested in Shanghai by Public Security officers from Manzhouli, Manchuria and charged with bribery, theft of state property, tax evasion, cheating on government contracts, and stealing of government economic information. Nee was also "re-educated". On January 11, 1956, there was a nationwide sweep targeting the co-workers and elders in the local churches. Some died in labor camps, while others faced long prison sentences. On January 18, 1956, the Religious Affairs Bureau began twelve days of accusation meetings at the church assembly hall on Nanyang Road in Shanghai, in which many accusations were brought against Nee in large accusation meetings. On June 21, 1956, Nee appeared before the High Court in Shanghai, where it was announced that he had been excommunicated by the elders in the church in Shanghai and found guilty on all charges. He was sentenced to fifteen years imprisonment with reform by labor. Initially, he was detained at Tilanqiao Prison in Shanghai but was later moved to other locations. Only his wife, Charity, was allowed to visit him.

On January 29, 1956, Public Security took over the Nanyang Road building, and many of Nee's co-workers were arrested, put into isolation, and forced to repudiate Watchman Nee. Some co-workers joined in the accusation of Watchman Nee while others, such as Peace Wang, Ruth Lee, and Yu Chenghua remained silent and were punished with life imprisonment. Following this, mass accusation meetings were held across the country to condemn the "anti-revolutionary sect of Watchman Nee".Lee, Joseph Tse-Hei. "Watchman Nee and the Little Flock Movement in Maoist China." Church History 74:1 (2005).

Later imprisonment and death
One year before Nee's death in 1972, his wife, Charity, died due to an accident and high blood pressure; Nee was not allowed to attend her funeral. Charity's eldest sister then took the responsibility to care for Nee in prison. Nee was scheduled for release in 1967 but was detained in prison until his death on May 30, 1972. There was no announcement of his death nor any funeral. His remains were cremated on June 1, 1972, before his family arrived at the prison.

Nee's grandniece recounted the time when she went to pick up Nee's ashes:

Beliefs
Nee believed in the verbal inspiration of the Bible and that the Bible is God's Word. He also believed that God is in one sense triune, Father, Son, and Spirit, distinctly three, yet fully one, co-existing and co-inhering each other from eternity to eternity. He believed that Jesus Christ is the Son of God, even God Himself, incarnated as a man with both the human life and the divine life, that He died on the cross to accomplish redemption, that he rose bodily from the dead on the third day, that He ascended into heaven and was enthroned, crowned with glory, and made the Lord of all, and that He will return the second time to receive His followers, to save Israel, and to establish His millennial kingdom on the earth. He believed that every person who believes in Jesus Christ will be forgiven by God, washed by His redeeming blood, justified by faith, regenerated by the Holy Spirit, and saved by grace. Such a believer is a child of God and a member of the Body of Christ. He also believed that the destiny of every believer is to be an integral part of the church, which is the Body of Christ and the house of God.
Nee had a unique blend of Brethren theology, the exchanged life theology of the Keswick conventions and his own east Asian insights into Christian theology.  His well-known book, "Sit, Walk, Stand" focused on the believer's position "in Christ," an important feature of the Apostle Paul's theology.

Publications
In addition to speaking frequently before many audiences, Watchman Nee authored various books, articles, newsletters, and hymns. Most of his books were based on notes taken down by students during his spoken messages. Some books were compiled from messages published previously in his periodicals.

Watchman Nee's best-known book in English is The Normal Christian Life, which is based on talks he delivered in English during a trip to Europe in 1938 and 1939. There he expressed theological views on the New Testament book of Romans.

Some of Watchman Nee's best-known books include:The Spiritual Man (1928) Translated in (1969)Concerning Our Missions (1939) Translated in (1942)The Song of Songs (1945) Translated in (1970)The Breaking of the Outer Man and the Release of the Spirit (1950) Translated in (1961)The Normal Christian Life (1938/1939) Translated in (1957)The Normal Christian Church Life (1938) Translated in (1965)Sit, Walk, Stand (1957) Translated in (1971)What Shall this Man Do? (1961) Translated in (1975)Love Not the World (1951) Translated in (1968)Let Us Pray (1942)  Translated in (1949)A Living Sacrifice (1932) Translated in (1950)Authority & Submission  (1941) Translated in (1950)The Spirit of the Gospel (1949) Translated in (1971)God's Work (1940) Translated in (1967)Back to the Cross (1931) Translated in (1956)Grace for Grace (1949) Translated in (1968)How to Study the Bible (1956) Translated in (1968) Practical Issues of this life (1938) Translated in (1970)The Mystery of Creation Translated in (1981)

In addition to publishing his own books, other spiritual publications were translated from English and published under Watchman Nee's oversight.  These included books by T. Austin-Sparks, Madame Guyon, Mary E. McDonough, Jessie Penn-Lewis, and others.

See also

The Lord's Recovery
Witness Lee
The Local ChurchesThe Normal Christian LifeMargaret E. Barber
Dora Yu

References

Further reading
Chen, James. Meet Brother Nee. Hong Kong: The Christian Publishers (1976).
Kinnear, Angus. Against the Tide. Eastbourne: Kingsway Publications (2005).
Laurent, Bob. Watchman Nee: Man of Suffering. Uhrichsville: Barbour Publishing (1998).
Lee, Witness. Watchman Nee: A Seer of the Divine Revelation in the Present Age. Anaheim: Living Stream Ministry (1991).
Lyall, Leslie. Three of China's Mighty Men. London: Overseas Missionary Fellowship (1973).
Nee, Watchman. Watchman Nee's Testimony. Hong Kong: Hong Kong Church Book Room (1974).
Roberts, Dana. Understanding Watchman Nee. Plainfield, NJ: Logos International (1980).
Roberts, Dana. Secrets of Watchman Nee. Orlando, FL: Bridge-Logos, 2005.
Sze, Newman. The Martyrdom of Watchman Nee. Culver City: Testimony Publications (1997).
Wu, Dongsheng John. Understanding Watchman Nee: Spirituality, Knowledge, and Formation''. Eugene: Wipf & Stock Publishers (2012).

External links

Living Stream Ministry: Watchman Nee
Watchman Nee's Biography 
Living Stream Ministry: The Collected Works of Watchman Nee 
Living Stream Ministry: Additional Titles by Watchman Nee
ChristianWebsites.org: Watchman Nee
Biographical Dictionary of CHINESE Christianity: Ni Tuosheng (Watchman Nee) 1903 ~ 1972 
Christian Fellowship Publishers: About Watchman Nee 

1903 births
1972 deaths
20th-century Christian mystics
Chinese evangelicals
Chinese Protestant missionaries
Chinese Christian theologians
Protestant mystics
Chinese Christian mystics
Chinese Protestant ministers and clergy
Chinese Plymouth Brethren
Christian writers
Chinese evangelists
Local Church movement
People from Fuzhou
Prisoners and detainees of the People's Republic of China
Persecution of Christians
Protestant missionaries in China
Religious persecution by communists